Tylothais ovata is a species of sea snail, a marine gastropod mollusk, in the family Muricidae, the murex snails or rock snails.

Distribution
This species occurs in South Africa (country).

References

Endemic fauna of South Africa
ovata
Gastropods described in 2017